Eresiomera osheba is a butterfly in the family Lycaenidae. It is found in Cameroon, Gabon, the Republic of the Congo and northern Angola.

References

Butterflies described in 1890
Poritiinae
Butterflies of Africa